William Madison (May 5, 1762 – July 20, 1843) was an American general. He attended Hampden-Sydney College in Virginia.   He served in the American Revolutionary War and War of 1812. Son of James Madison Sr. and Eleanor Rose Conway, he was the younger brother of James Madison, fourth President of the United States. Madison married Frances Throckmorton and had eleven children. He was the grandfather of Confederate Brigadier-General James E. Slaughter.

References

1762 births
1843 deaths
Madison family
People from King George County, Virginia